James H. Hutchins was an American politician from New York.

Life
He was a member of the New York State Assembly (Kings Co., 3rd D.) in 1853.

He was a member of the New York State Senate (2nd D.) in 1854 and 1855.

Sources
The New York Civil List compiled by Franklin Benjamin Hough (pages 137, 142, 245 and 283; Weed, Parsons and Co., 1858)

Year of birth missing
Year of death missing
Democratic Party members of the New York State Assembly
Democratic Party New York (state) state senators
People from Brooklyn